The Gelderlander is a Dutch breed of warmblood horse. It was bred in the province of Gelderland in the Netherlands as a carriage horse capable also of farm work. It declined in popularity in the mid-twentieth century. In 1965 it was one of the foundation breeds of the Dutch Warmblood or KWPN, the other being the heavier Groninger horse from the north. It is registered in a division of the Royal Dutch Warmblood Horse Studbook, which also has divisions for the Dutch Warmblood and for the Dutch Harness Horse.

It is an endangered breed; in 2017 the breeding population numbered 600 mares and 35 stallions.

History 

The Gelderlander was bred from the late nineteenth century in the province of Gelderland in the Netherlands as a carriage horse capable also of farm work, and with some capability as a heavy riding horse. Local mares were cross-bred with imported stallions of a wide range of breeds and types, among them Alt-Oldenburger and Ostfriesen, Anglo-Arab, Arab, Cleveland Bay, English half-bred, Furioso, Hackney, Nonius, Norfolk Roadster, Orlov and Orlov-Rostopchin.

Three breed types were registered in the stud-book: riding horses (the Dutch Warmblood); harness horses (the Dutch Harness Horse); and the Gelderlander.

Characteristics 
The Gelderlander is most often chestnut, often with extensive white markings.

Uses 

The Gelderland is much used in competitive carriage driving; it jumps well and reliably but is not fast.

References

Further reading 
 Gelderland, from International Museum of the horse
  Vanstraelen, Guy. "The Stars Hidden Behind 'Horses of the Dutch.'" 10-17-2005. Accessed 1-7-2007.
 Gelders Paard International.

Horse breeds
Horse breeds originating in the Netherlands